Dannah Phirman (born Dannah Feinglass) is an American actress, comedian, and writer best known for co-starring as Narge Hemingway in the Adult Swim series Newsreaders. She is also the co-creator and co-star of the Hulu reality TV parody series The Hotwives. She was a member of the long-running sketch comedy troupe Respecto Montalban, one of the original improv groups at the Upright Citizens Brigade Theatre.

Biography
Phirman majored in theater at SUNY Geneseo and graduated in 1997. After moving to New York City in 1998 she became involved with the Upright Citizens Brigade Theater where she was a part of the improv sketch group Respecto Montalban. Phirman teaches sketch comedy writing and improv, and has performed in two-person shows like Eye Candy (with Danielle Schneider), which went to the 2002 U.S. Comedy Arts Festival in Aspen, and Special Delivery (with Paul Scheer), a parody of a British children's show in which postal workers rummage through people's mail in search of heartwarming lessons and edibles. She and Scheer won a 2004 Nightlife Award for Automatic Vaudeville, called "the best variety show in New York City" by Time Out New York. She has since collaborated with creative partner Danielle Schneider on other sketch shows such as Let's Get Awkward and Dead Heiresses at the Los Angeles UCB, as well as a five-woman improv show Mother F#$@er. Dead Heiresses was also developed as a pilot for Comedy Central in 2007.

Acting
Dannah Phirman was a cast member on Fox’s MADtv from 2000-2001, where she notably portrayed Angelina Jolie, Debi Mazar, Liza Minnelli and Shirley Temple. Phirman is also a voice actress, providing the voice of the title character as well as her alter ego, Becky Botsford, in the PBS Kids animated series, WordGirl, Penny, the side-kick to Amy Poehler's Bessie Higgenbottom in Nickelodeon's The Mighty B!, Zaria on the Nickelodeon original series, Tak and the Power of Juju, was a contributing voice to Current TV's SuperNews! show and has recently provided voices for the video game Mass Effect as well as White Knight Chronicles: International Edition.

Writing
Phirman has written episodes of WordGirl and The Mighty B!, and the direct-to-video sequel to Beverly Hills Chihuahua with her writing partner Danielle Schneider. Phirman and Schneider are currently working on scripts for the upcoming movies Catfight for New Line Cinema and Boys Are Stupid, Throw Rocks at Them for Universal.

Phirman and Schneider created the Hulu reality TV parody series The Hotwives and were writers on the NBC sitcoms Marry Me and Telenovela. In 2017, Phirman and Schneider worked as writers and producers on It's Always Sunny in Philadelphia as well as on the TruTV sitcom I'm Sorry.

Personal life
Dannah (pronounced "Donna") is married to musical comedian Mike Phirman (the "Phirm" half of the comedy duo Hard 'n Phirm). Their son Milo Phirman was born on September 4, 2009.

Filmography
The Fairly OddParents - Missy
Kung Fu Panda: Legends of Awesomeness - Xiao Niao
The Mighty B! - Penny
My Gym Partner's A Monkey - Possum Girl
Phineas and Ferb - Teenage Milly ("Act Your Age")
Tak and the Power of Juju - Zaria
Mass Effect - Avina
WordGirl - WordGirl/Becky Botsford, Claire McCallister, Chuck the Evil Sandwich Making Guy's Mother, Edith Von Hoosinghaus, Pretty Princess (season 1-8), Female Police Officers
MADtv - various characters (credited as Dannah Feinglass)
White Knight Chronicles - Yulie
White Knight Chronicles II - Yulie
Talking Tom and Friends - Ben's Mom, Mother, Moon
Childrens Hospital (TV series) - Appalled Mom
Pencilmation - Pencilmiss Brett (2012-2020)
The Northside Show - Pencilmiss Brett (primarily season 9)
My Life - Additional Voices

References

External links
 

Living people
Actresses from New York (state)
American infotainers
American sketch comedians
American television actresses
American television personalities
American television writers
American voice actresses
Place of birth missing (living people)
American women comedians
American women screenwriters
American women television personalities
American women television writers
Comedians from New York (state)
Jewish American actresses
Jewish American comedians
Jewish American female comedians
Jewish American writers
People from Long Island
State University of New York at Geneseo alumni
Upright Citizens Brigade Theater performers
21st-century American actresses
21st-century American comedians
21st-century American Jews
21st-century American screenwriters
Year of birth missing (living people)